Rubus septentrionalis is a species of bramble widely distributed in Northern Europe (Denmark, Great Britain, Ireland, Norway and Sweden). It grows at higher latitudes than most other brambles.

Description
Rubus septentrionalis is an arching shrub with a dark red, furrowed stem. This stem bears numerous robust prickles, which can be longer than the stem diameter. Leaves have 5 dark green, usually hairy leaflets. The flowers can be white or a light pink.

Distribution and habitat
R. septentrionalis is a plant of streamsides, woodland edges and  stony ground. It is intolerant of heavy shade. In Great Britain and Ireland, its distribution is rather scattered, except in Scotland, where it is common. This species is one of the few Rubus species which grow in the extreme north of Britain, with multiple records from the Hebrides, Orkneys, and Caithness.

References

septentrionalis
Plants described in 1946
Flora of Great Britain
Flora of Denmark
Flora of Ireland
Flora of Norway
Flora of Sweden